Yukon–Koyukuk School District (YKSD) is a school district headquartered in College, a census-designated place in Fairbanks North Star Borough, Alaska. It serves the Yukon–Koyukuk area.

Schools
 Allakaket School (Allakaket)
 Gladys Dart School closed (Manley Hot Springs)
 Andrew K. Demoski School (Nulato)
 Jimmy Huntington School (Huslia)
 Kaltag School (Kaltag)
 Merreline A. Kangas School (Ruby)
 Minto School (Minto)
 Johnny Oldman School (Hughes)
 Ella B. Vernetti School (Koyukuk)
 Rampart School (Rampart)
Students may also receive services from the Raven Homeschool statewide homeschooling program.

Closed schools:
 Bettles - Bettles Field School
 Coldfoot
 Wiseman

References

External links
 

School districts in Alaska
Education in Unorganized Borough, Alaska
Yukon–Koyukuk Census Area, Alaska